The Videocon Cup was the name of the One Day International cricket tournament in the Netherlands during August 2004. It was a tri-nation series between Australia, India and Pakistan. All matches took place at the VRA Cricket Ground, Amstelveen. The tournament preceded, and acted as a warm-up for, the 2004 ICC Champions Trophy.

The tournament was disrupted by rain, with only one of the three group stage matches reaching a conclusion. Australia refused to reschedule their two washed-out group matches, and qualified for the final without completing a game.

By beating India in the opening match, Pakistan also qualified for the Final. Australia beat Pakistan in the Final to win the series.

Shoaib Malik of Pakistan emerged as the top run-scorer with 104 runs, with an average of 52.00; Matthew Hayden of Australia followed close behind with 88 runs. Lakshmipathy Balaji of India finished the series as top wicket-taker capturing 6 wickets, with Shahid Afridi of Pakistan taking 4.

Squads

Points table

Group stage matches

1st match

2nd match

3rd match

Final

References

External links
 Tournament home at ESPN Cricinfo
 Videocon Cup in Netherlands, Aug 2004 (Aus, Ind, Pak) at ESPNcricinfo archive
 
 

2004 in Australian cricket
2004 in Indian cricket
2004 in Pakistani cricket
2004 in Dutch sport
International cricket competitions in 2004
International cricket competitions in the Netherlands